Sea Cliff Yacht Club is a yacht club located in Sea Cliff, New York (United States). With access to the Long Island Sound via Hempstead Harbor.

Description 
Sea Cliff Yacht Club was founded in 1892. Members racing One-Designs have won World Championships in the Snipe (Philip Benson Jr. and Bill Benson, 1936 Worlds), Star and Sonar classes. The club hosted the Snipe Worlds in 1937, and the North Americans in 1981. Since 1977, Sea Cliff Yacht Club has hosted the Around Long Island Regatta.

References

External links 
 Official website

1892 establishments in New York (state)
Sailing in New York (state)
Yacht clubs in the United States